Dawn is the second studio album by Ry X, released through Infectious Records and Loma Vista Records. The album was released on 6 May 2016. The album charted at #34 in the UK Album Charts as well as charting in Germany, France, Canada and Australia. It gained favourable reception from the media, with a New York Times review saying "His voice is a pearly, androgynous tenor, a vessel for liquid melancholy that blurs words at the edges. He stretches pop structures with repetition that grows devotional, obsessive, hypnotic". In support of the album, RY X began an extensive tour across Europe and the US as well as appearing at many festival throughout 2016 such as Barn on the Farm and Montreux Jazz Festival.

Track listing

Charts

References 

2016 albums
Ry X albums